The Nikola Tesla Technical Museum is a technology museum located in Zagreb, Croatia, which collects and showcases scientific and technical appliances used in the country's history. It exhibits numerous historic aircraft, cars, machinery and equipment.

History
The Technical Museum was founded in 1954, officially opening to the public on the 14 January 1963. on Savska street.

In 2012, the museum had 125,000 visitors. In 2013, it had over 118,000 visitors, and was the most visited museum in Croatia. With 141,000 visitors in 2018, it was the 7th most visited museum in Croatia.

In June 2015, the City Assembly of the City of Zagreb decided to rename the Technical Museum after Nikola Tesla.

Features

The museum maintains the oldest preserved steam engine in the area, dating from the mid-19th century, which is still operational.

There are various distinct sections in the museum:
 the Planetarium, used to be run by Ante Radonić
 the Beehive exhibit
 the Nikola Tesla study.

The Museum organises educational, study, informative and occasional exhibitions, lectures and panel discussions on popular science, as well as playrooms and workshops.

References

External links

 Technical Museum at the Croatian Museum Documentation Center
 

Museums established in 1954
Museums in Zagreb
Trešnjevka
1954 establishments in Croatia
Technology museums in Croatia
Nikola Tesla